This is a list of the bird species recorded in the Central African Republic. The avifauna of the Central African Republic include a total of 767 species.

This list's taxonomic treatment (designation and sequence of orders, families and species) and nomenclature (common and scientific names) follow the conventions of The Clements Checklist of Birds of the World, 2022 edition. The family accounts at the beginning of each heading reflect this taxonomy, as do the species counts found in each family account. Accidental species are included in the total species count for the Central African Republic.

The following tags have been used to highlight several categories. The commonly occurring native species do not fall into any of these categories.
(A) Accidental - a species that rarely or accidentally occurs in the Central African Republic
(I) Introduced - a species introduced to the Central African Republic as a consequence, direct or indirect, of human actions

Ostriches
Order: StruthioniformesFamily: Struthionidae

The ostrich is a flightless bird native to Africa. It is the largest living species of bird. It is distinctive in its appearance, with a long neck and legs and the ability to run at high speeds.
 Common ostrich, Struthio camelus

Ducks, geese, and waterfowl
Order: AnseriformesFamily: Anatidae

Anatidae includes the ducks and most duck-like waterfowl, such as geese and swans. These birds are adapted to an aquatic existence with webbed feet, flattened bills, and feathers that are excellent at shedding water due to an oily coating.

 White-faced whistling-duck, Dendrocygna viduata
 Fulvous whistling-duck, Dendrocygna bicolor
 White-backed duck, Thalassornis leuconotus (A)
 Knob-billed duck, Sarkidiornis melanotos
 Hartlaub's duck, Pteronetta hartlaubii
 Egyptian goose, Alopochen aegyptiacus
 Spur-winged goose, Plectropterus gambensis
 African pygmy-goose, Nettapus auritus
 Garganey, Spatula querquedula
 Northern shoveler, Spatula clypeata (A)
 Northern pintail, Anas acuta
 Green-winged teal, Anas crecca
 Ferruginous duck, Aythya nyroca

Guineafowl
Order: GalliformesFamily: Numididae

Guineafowl are a group of African, seed-eating, ground-nesting birds that resemble partridges, but with featherless heads and spangled grey plumage.

 Helmeted guineafowl, Numida meleagris
 Black guineafowl, Agelastes niger
 Plumed guineafowl, Guttera plumifera
 Western crested guineafowl, Guttera verreauxi

New World quail
Order: GalliformesFamily: Odontophoridae

The New World quails are small, plump terrestrial birds only distantly related to the quails of the Old World, but named for their similar appearance and habits.

 Stone partridge, Ptilopachus petrosus

Pheasants, grouse, and allies
Order: GalliformesFamily: Phasianidae

The Phasianidae are a family of terrestrial birds which consists of quails, snowcocks, francolins, spurfowls, tragopans, monals, pheasants, peafowls and jungle fowls. In general, they are plump (although they vary in size) and have broad, relatively short wings.

 Latham's francolin, Peliperdix lathami
 Schlegel's francolin, Campocolinus schlegelii
 Blue quail, Synoicus adansonii
 Common quail, Coturnix coturnix (A)
 Harlequin quail, Coturnix delegorguei
 Scaly francolin, Pternistis squamatus
 Heuglin's francolin, Pternistis icterorhynchus
 Clapperton's francolin, Pternistis clappertoni

Grebes
Order: PodicipediformesFamily: Podicipedidae

Grebes are small to medium-large freshwater diving birds. They have lobed toes and are excellent swimmers and divers. However, they have their feet placed far back on the body, making them quite ungainly on land. 

 Little grebe, Tachybaptus ruficollis

Pigeons and doves
Order: ColumbiformesFamily: Columbidae

Pigeons and doves are stout-bodied birds with short necks and short slender bills with a fleshy cere.

 Rock pigeon, Columba livia (I)
 Speckled pigeon, Columba guinea
 Afep pigeon, Columba unicincta
 Bronze-naped pigeon, Columba iriditorques
 Mourning collared-dove, Streptopelia decipiens
 Red-eyed dove, Streptopelia semitorquata
 Vinaceous dove, Streptopelia vinacea
 Laughing dove, Streptopelia senegalensis
 Black-billed wood-dove, Turtur abyssinicus
 Blue-spotted wood-dove, Turtur afer
 Tambourine dove, Turtur tympanistria
 Blue-headed wood-dove, Turtur brehmeri
 Namaqua dove, Oena capensis
 Bruce's green-pigeon, Treron waalia
 African green-pigeon, Treron calva

Sandgrouse
Order: PterocliformesFamily: Pteroclidae

Sandgrouse have small, pigeon like heads and necks, but sturdy compact bodies. They have long pointed wings and sometimes tails and a fast direct flight. Flocks fly to watering holes at dawn and dusk. Their legs are feathered down to the toes.

 Chestnut-bellied sandgrouse, Pterocles exustus
 Four-banded sandgrouse, Pterocles quadricinctus

Bustards
Order: OtidiformesFamily: Otididae

Bustards are large terrestrial birds mainly associated with dry open country and steppes in the Old World. They are omnivorous and nest on the ground. They walk steadily on strong legs and big toes, pecking for food as they go. They have long broad wings with "fingered" wingtips and striking patterns in flight. Many have interesting mating displays.

 Arabian bustard, Ardeotis arabs (A)
 Denham's bustard, Neotis denhami
 White-bellied bustard, Eupodotis senegalensis
 Black-bellied bustard, Lissotis melanogaster

Turacos
Order: MusophagiformesFamily: Musophagidae

The turacos, plantain eaters and go-away-birds make up the bird family Musophagidae. They are medium-sized arboreal birds. The turacos and plantain eaters are brightly coloured, usually in blue, green or purple. The go-away birds are mostly grey and white.

 Great blue turaco, Corythaeola cristata
 Guinea turaco, Tauraco persa
 Black-billed turaco, Tauraco schuettii
 White-crested turaco, Tauraco leucolophus
 Ross's turaco, Musophaga rossae
 Western plantain-eater, Crinifer piscator
 Eastern plantain-eater, Crinifer zonurus

Cuckoos and anis
Order: CuculiformesFamily: Cuculidae

The family Cuculidae includes cuckoos, roadrunners and anis. These birds are of variable size with slender bodies, long tails and strong legs. The Old World cuckoos are brood parasites.

 Gabon coucal, Centropus anselli
 Senegal coucal, Centropus senegalensis
 Blue-headed coucal, Centropus monachus
 Black coucal, Centropus grillii
 Blue malkoha, Ceuthmochares aereus
 Great spotted cuckoo, Clamator glandarius
 Levaillant's cuckoo, Clamator levaillantii
 Pied cuckoo, Clamator jacobinus
 Thick-billed cuckoo, Pachycoccyx audeberti
 Dideric cuckoo, Chrysococcyx caprius
 Klaas's cuckoo, Chrysococcyx klaas
 Yellow-throated cuckoo, Chrysococcyx flavigularis
 African emerald cuckoo, Chrysococcyx cupreus
 Dusky long-tailed cuckoo, Cercococcyx mechowi
 Olive long-tailed cuckoo, Cercococcyx olivinus (A)
 Black cuckoo, Cuculus clamosus
 Red-chested cuckoo, Cuculus solitarius
 African cuckoo, Cuculus gularis
 Common cuckoo, Cuculus canorus

Nightjars and allies
Order: CaprimulgiformesFamily: Caprimulgidae

Nightjars are medium-sized nocturnal birds that usually nest on the ground. They have long wings, short legs and very short bills. Most have small feet, of little use for walking, and long pointed wings. Their soft plumage is camouflaged to resemble bark or leaves.

 Pennant-winged nightjar, Caprimulgus vexillarius
 Standard-winged nightjar, Caprimulgus longipennis
 Brown nightjar, Caprimulgus binotatus
Fiery-necked nightjar, Caprimulgus pectoralis
 Swamp nightjar, Caprimulgus natalensis
 Plain nightjar, Caprimulgus inornatus
 Freckled nightjar, Caprimulgus tristigma
 Bates's nightjar, Caprimulgus batesi
 Long-tailed nightjar, Caprimulgus climacurus

Swifts
Order: CaprimulgiformesFamily: Apodidae

Swifts are small birds which spend the majority of their lives flying. These birds have very short legs and never settle voluntarily on the ground, perching instead only on vertical surfaces. Many swifts have long swept-back wings which resemble a crescent or boomerang.

 Mottled spinetail, Telacanthura ussheri
 Black spinetail, Telacanthura melanopygia
 Sabine's spinetail, Rhaphidura sabini
 Cassin's spinetail, Neafrapus cassini
 Alpine swift, Apus melba (A)
 Common swift, Apus apus
 Pallid swift, Apus pallidus (A)
 Little swift, Apus affinis
 White-rumped swift, Apus caffer
 African palm-swift, Cypsiurus parvus

Flufftails
Order: GruiformesFamily: Sarothruridae

The flufftails are a small family of ground-dwelling birds found only in Madagascar and sub-Saharan Africa.

 White-spotted flufftail, Sarothrura pulchra
 Buff-spotted flufftail, Sarothrura elegans
 Red-chested flufftail, Sarothrura rufa
 Chestnut-headed flufftail, Sarothrura lugens (A)

Rails, gallinules and coots
Order: GruiformesFamily: Rallidae

Rallidae is a large family of small to medium-sized birds which includes the rails, crakes, coots and gallinules. Typically they inhabit dense vegetation in damp environments near lakes, swamps or rivers. In general they are shy and secretive birds, making them difficult to observe. Most species have strong legs and long toes which are well adapted to soft uneven surfaces. They tend to have short, rounded wings and to be weak fliers.

 African rail, Rallus caerulescens
 African crake, Crex egregia
 Lesser moorhen, Paragallinula angulata
 Eurasian moorhen, Gallinula chloropus
 Allen's gallinule, Porphyrio alleni
 African swamphen, Porphyrio madagascariensis
 Nkulengu rail, Himantornis haematopus
 Black crake, Zapornia flavirostris

Finfoots
Order: GruiformesFamily: Heliornithidae

Heliornithidae is a small family of tropical birds with webbed lobes on their feet similar to those of grebes and coots. 

 African finfoot, Podica senegalensis

Cranes
Order: GruiformesFamily: Gruidae

Cranes are large, long-legged and long-necked birds. Unlike the similar-looking but unrelated herons, cranes fly with necks outstretched, not pulled back. Most have elaborate and noisy courting displays or "dances".

 Black crowned-crane, Balearica pavonina

Thick-knees
Order: CharadriiformesFamily: Burhinidae

The thick-knees are a group of largely tropical waders in the family Burhinidae. They are found worldwide within the tropical zone, with some species also breeding in temperate Europe and Australia. They are medium to large waders with strong black or yellow-black bills, large yellow eyes and cryptic plumage. Despite being classed as waders, most species have a preference for arid or semi-arid habitats. 

 Water thick-knee, Burhinus vermiculatus
 Eurasian thick-knee, Burhinus oedicnemus
 Senegal thick-knee, Burhinus senegalensis
 Spotted thick-knee, Burhinus capensis

Egyptian plover
Order: CharadriiformesFamily: Pluvianidae

The Egyptian plover is found across equatorial Africa and along the Nile River.

Egyptian plover, Pluvianus aegyptius

Stilts and avocets
Order: CharadriiformesFamily: Recurvirostridae

Recurvirostridae is a family of large wading birds, which includes the avocets and stilts. The avocets have long legs and long up-curved bills. The stilts have extremely long legs and long, thin, straight bills. 

 Black-winged stilt, Himantopus himantopus
 Pied avocet, Recurvirostra avosetta (A)

Plovers and lapwings
Order: CharadriiformesFamily: Charadriidae

The family Charadriidae includes the plovers, dotterels and lapwings. They are small to medium-sized birds with compact bodies, short, thick necks and long, usually pointed, wings. They are found in open country worldwide, mostly in habitats near water.

 Spur-winged lapwing, Vanellus spinosus
 Black-headed lapwing, Vanellus tectus
 White-headed lapwing, Vanellus albiceps
 Wattled lapwing, Vanellus senegallus
 Brown-chested lapwing, Vanellus superciliosus
 Kittlitz's plover, Charadrius pecuarius
 Kentish plover, Charadrius alexandrinus
 Common ringed plover, Charadrius hiaticula
 Little ringed plover, Charadrius dubius
 Forbes's plover, Charadrius forbesi
 White-fronted plover, Charadrius marginatus

Painted-snipes
Order: CharadriiformesFamily: Rostratulidae

Painted-snipes are short-legged, long-billed birds similar in shape to the true snipes, but more brightly coloured.

 Greater painted-snipe, Rostratula benghalensis

Jacanas
Order: CharadriiformesFamily: Jacanidae

The jacanas are a group of tropical waders in the family Jacanidae. They are found throughout the tropics. They are identifiable by their huge feet and claws which enable them to walk on floating vegetation in the shallow lakes that are their preferred habitat.

 Lesser jacana, Microparra capensis
 African jacana, Actophilornis africanus

Sandpipers and allies
Order: CharadriiformesFamily: Scolopacidae

Scolopacidae is a large diverse family of small to medium-sized shorebirds including the sandpipers, curlews, godwits, shanks, tattlers, woodcocks, snipes, dowitchers and phalaropes. The majority of these species eat small invertebrates picked out of the mud or soil. Variation in length of legs and bills enables multiple species to feed in the same habitat, particularly on the coast, without direct competition for food. 

 Eurasian curlew, Numenius arquata
 Bar-tailed godwit, Limosa lapponica (A)
 Black-tailed godwit, Limosa limosa
 Ruddy turnstone, Arenaria interpres (A)
 Red knot, Calidris canutus (A)
 Ruff, Calidris pugnax
 Curlew sandpiper, Calidris ferruginea
 Temminck's stint, Calidris temminckii
 Sanderling, Calidris alba
 Little stint, Calidris minuta
 Jack snipe, Lymnocryptes minimus (A)
 Great snipe, Gallinago media
 Common snipe, Gallinago gallinago
 Terek sandpiper, Xenus cinereus (A)
 Common sandpiper, Actitis hypoleucos
 Green sandpiper, Tringa ochropus
 Spotted redshank, Tringa erythropus (A)
 Common greenshank, Tringa nebularia
 Marsh sandpiper, Tringa stagnatilis
 Wood sandpiper, Tringa glareola
 Common redshank, Tringa totanus

Buttonquail
Order: CharadriiformesFamily: Turnicidae

The buttonquail are small, drab, running birds which resemble the true quails. The female is the brighter of the sexes and initiates courtship. The male incubates the eggs and tends the young.

 Small buttonquail, Turnix sylvatica
 Black-rumped buttonquail, Turnix nanus
 Quail-plover, Ortyxelos meiffrenii (A)

Pratincoles and coursers
Order: CharadriiformesFamily: Glareolidae

Glareolidae is a family of wading birds comprising the pratincoles, which have short legs, long pointed wings and long forked tails, and the coursers, which have long legs, short wings and long, pointed bills which curve downwards.

 Temminck's courser, Cursorius temminckii
 Bronze-winged courser, Rhinoptilus chalcopterus
 Collared pratincole, Glareola pratincola
 Black-winged pratincole, Glareola nordmanni (A)
 Rock pratincole, Glareola nuchalis
 Gray pratincole, Glareola cinerea

Gulls, terns, and skimmers
Order: CharadriiformesFamily: Laridae

Laridae is a family of medium to large seabirds, the gulls, terns, and skimmers. Gulls are typically grey or white, often with black markings on the head or wings. They have stout, longish bills and webbed feet. Terns are a group of generally medium to large seabirds typically with grey or white plumage, often with black markings on the head. Most terns hunt fish by diving but some pick insects off the surface of fresh water. Terns are generally long-lived birds, with several species known to live in excess of 30 years. Skimmers are a small family of tropical tern-like birds. They have an elongated lower mandible which they use to feed by flying low over the water surface and skimming the water for small fish.

 Gray-hooded gull, Chroicocephalus cirrocephalus (A)
 Black-headed gull, Chroicocephalus ridibundus (A)
 Lesser black-backed gull, Larus fuscus
 Gull-billed tern, Gelochelidon nilotica (A)
 Caspian tern, Hydroprogne caspia
 White-winged tern, Chlidonias leucopterus
 Whiskered tern, Chlidonias hybrida
 Arctic tern, Sterna paradisaea (A)
 African skimmer, Rynchops flavirostris

Storks
Order: CiconiiformesFamily: Ciconiidae

Storks are large, long-legged, long-necked, wading birds with long, stout bills. Storks are mute, but bill-clattering is an important mode of communication at the nest. Their nests can be large and may be reused for many years. Many species are migratory.

 African openbill, Anastomus lamelligerus
 Black stork, Ciconia nigra
 Abdim's stork, Ciconia abdimii
 African woolly-necked stork, Ciconia microscelis
 White stork, Ciconia ciconia
 Saddle-billed stork, Ephippiorhynchus senegalensis
 Marabou stork, Leptoptilos crumenifer
 Yellow-billed stork, Mycteria ibis

Anhingas
Order: SuliformesFamily: Anhingidae

Anhingas or darters are often called "snake-birds" because of their long thin neck, which gives a snake-like appearance when they swim with their bodies submerged. The males have black and dark-brown plumage, an erectile crest on the nape and a larger bill than the female. The females have much paler plumage especially on the neck and underparts. The darters have completely webbed feet and their legs are short and set far back on the body. Their plumage is somewhat permeable, like that of cormorants, and they spread their wings to dry after diving.

 African darter, Anhinga rufa

Cormorants and shags
Order: SuliformesFamily: Phalacrocoracidae

Phalacrocoracidae is a family of medium to large coastal, fish-eating seabirds that includes cormorants and shags. Plumage colouration varies, with the majority having mainly dark plumage, some species being black-and-white and a few being colourful.

 Long-tailed cormorant, Microcarbo africanus

Pelicans
Order: PelecaniformesFamily: Pelecanidae

Pelicans are large water birds with a distinctive pouch under their beak. As with other members of the order Pelecaniformes, they have webbed feet with four toes. 

 Great white pelican, Pelecanus onocrotalus
 Pink-backed pelican, Pelecanus rufescens

Shoebill
Order: PelecaniformesFamily: Balaenicipididae

The shoebill is a large bird related to the storks. It derives its name from its massive shoe-shaped bill.

 Shoebill, Balaeniceps rex

Hammerkop
Order: PelecaniformesFamily: Scopidae

The hammerkop is a medium-sized bird with a long shaggy crest. The shape of its head with a curved bill and crest at the back is reminiscent of a hammer, hence its name. Its plumage is drab-brown all over.

 Hamerkop, Scopus umbretta

Herons, egrets, and bitterns
Order: PelecaniformesFamily: Ardeidae

The family Ardeidae contains the bitterns, herons and egrets. Herons and egrets are medium to large wading birds with long necks and legs. Bitterns tend to be shorter necked and more wary. Members of Ardeidae fly with their necks retracted, unlike other long-necked birds such as storks, ibises and spoonbills.

 Great bittern, Botaurus stellaris
 Dwarf bittern, Ixobrychus sturmii
 Little bittern, Ixobrychus minutus
 White-crested bittern, Tigriornis leucolophus
 Gray heron, Ardea cinerea
 Black-headed heron, Ardea melanocephala
 Goliath heron, Ardea goliath
 Purple heron, Ardea purpurea
 Great egret, Ardea alba
 Intermediate egret, Ardea intermedia
 Little egret, Egretta garzetta
 Cattle egret, Bubulcus ibis
 Squacco heron, Ardeola ralloides
 Striated heron, Butorides striata
 Black-crowned night-heron, Nycticorax nycticorax
 White-backed night-heron, Gorsachius leuconotus

Ibises and spoonbills
Order: PelecaniformesFamily: Threskiornithidae

Threskiornithidae is a family of large terrestrial and wading birds which includes the ibises and spoonbills. They have long, broad wings with 11 primary and about 20 secondary feathers. They are strong fliers and despite their size and weight, very capable soarers.

 Glossy ibis, Plegadis falcinellus
 African sacred ibis, Threskiornis aethiopicus
 Spot-breasted ibis, Bostrychia rara
 Hadada ibis, Bostrychia hagedash
 African spoonbill, Platalea alba

Secretarybird
Order: AccipitriformesFamily: Sagittariidae

The secretarybird is a bird of prey in the order Accipitriformes but is easily distinguished from other raptors by its long crane-like legs.

 Secretarybird, Sagittarius serpentarius

Osprey
Order: AccipitriformesFamily: Pandionidae

The family Pandionidae contains only one species, the osprey. The osprey is a medium-large raptor which is a specialist fish-eater with a worldwide distribution.

 Osprey, Pandion haliaetus

Hawks, eagles, and kites
Order: AccipitriformesFamily: Accipitridae

Accipitridae is a family of birds of prey, which includes hawks, eagles, kites, harriers and Old World vultures. These birds have powerful hooked beaks for tearing flesh from their prey, strong legs, powerful talons and keen eyesight.

 Black-winged kite, Elanus caeruleus
 Scissor-tailed kite, Chelictinia riocourii
 African harrier-hawk, Polyboroides typus
 Palm-nut vulture, Gypohierax angolensis
 European honey-buzzard, Pernis apivorus
 African cuckoo-hawk, Aviceda cuculoides
 White-headed vulture, Trigonoceps occipitalis
 Lappet-faced vulture, Torgos tracheliotos
 Hooded vulture, Necrosyrtes monachus
 White-backed vulture, Gyps africanus
 Rüppell's griffon, Gyps rueppelli
 Bateleur, Terathopius ecaudatus
 Congo serpent-eagle, Dryotriorchis spectabilis
 Beaudouin's snake-eagle, Circaetus beaudouini
 Black-chested snake-eagle, Circaetus pectoralis (A)
 Brown snake-eagle, Circaetus cinereus
 Banded snake-eagle, Circaetus cinerascens
 Bat hawk, Macheiramphus alcinus
 Crowned eagle, Stephanoaetus coronatus
 Martial eagle, Polemaetus bellicosus
 Long-crested eagle, Lophaetus occipitalis
 Lesser spotted eagle, Clanga pomarina (A)
 Wahlberg's eagle, Hieraaetus wahlbergi
 Booted eagle, Hieraaetus pennatus
 Ayres's hawk-eagle, Hieraaetus ayresii
 Tawny eagle, Aquila rapax
 Cassin's hawk-eagle, Aquila africana
 African hawk-eagle, Aquila spilogaster
 Lizard buzzard, Kaupifalco monogrammicus
 Dark chanting-goshawk, Melierax metabates
 Pale chanting-goshawk, Melierax canorus (A)
 Gabar goshawk, Micronisus gabar
 Grasshopper buzzard, Butastur rufipennis
 Eurasian marsh-harrier, Circus aeruginosus
 African marsh-harrier, Circus ranivorus
 Pallid harrier, Circus macrourus
 Montagu's harrier, Circus pygargus
African goshawk, Accipiter tachiro
 African goshawk, Accipiter tachiro
 Chestnut-flanked sparrowhawk, Accipiter castanilius
 Shikra, Accipiter badius
 Levant sparrowhawk, Accipiter brevipes (A)
 Red-thighed sparrowhawk, Accipiter erythropus
 Little sparrowhawk, Accipiter minullus (A)
 Ovambo sparrowhawk, Accipiter ovampensis (A)
 Black goshawk, Accipiter melanoleucus
 Long-tailed hawk, Urotriorchis macrourus
 Black kite, Milvus migrans
 African fish-eagle, Haliaeetus vocifer
 Common buzzard, Buteo buteo
 Long-legged buzzard, Buteo rufinus (A)
 Red-necked buzzard, Buteo auguralis

Barn-owls
Order: StrigiformesFamily: Tytonidae

Barn-owls are medium to large owls with large heads and characteristic heart-shaped faces. They have long strong legs with powerful talons.

 Barn owl, Tyto alba

Owls
Order: StrigiformesFamily: Strigidae

The typical owls are small to large solitary nocturnal birds of prey. They have large forward-facing eyes and ears, a hawk-like beak and a conspicuous circle of feathers around each eye called a facial disk.

 Sandy scops-owl, Otus icterorhynchus (A)
 African scops-owl, Otus senegalensis
 Northern white-faced owl, Ptilopsis leucotis
 Grayish eagle-owl, Bubo cinerascens
 Fraser's eagle-owl, Bubo poensis
 Verreaux's eagle-owl, Bubo lacteus
 Akun eagle-owl, Bubo leucostictus (A)
 Pel's fishing-owl, Scotopelia peli
 Vermiculated fishing-owl, Scotopelia bouvieri
 Pearl-spotted owlet, Glaucidium perlatum
 Red-chested owlet, Glaucidium tephronotum (A)
 Sjostedt's owlet, Glaucidium sjostedti (A)
African barred owlet, Glaucidium capense (A)
 African wood-owl, Strix woodfordii
 Marsh owl, Asio capensis

Mousebirds
Order: ColiiformesFamily: Coliidae

The mousebirds are slender greyish or brown birds with soft, hairlike body feathers and very long thin tails. They are arboreal and scurry through the leaves like rodents in search of berries, fruit and buds. They are acrobatic and can feed upside down. All species have strong claws and reversible outer toes. They also have crests and stubby bills. 

 Speckled mousebird, Colius striatus
 Blue-naped mousebird, Urocolius macrourus (A)

Trogons
Order: TrogoniformesFamily: Trogonidae

The family Trogonidae includes trogons and quetzals. Found in tropical woodlands worldwide, they feed on insects and fruit, and their broad bills and weak legs reflect their diet and arboreal habits. Although their flight is fast, they are reluctant to fly any distance. Trogons have soft, often colourful, feathers with distinctive male and female plumage. 

 Narina trogon, Apaloderma narina
 Bare-cheeked trogon, Apaloderma aequatoriale (A)

Hoopoes
Order: BucerotiformesFamily: Upupidae

Hoopoes have black, white and orangey-pink colouring with a large erectile crest on their head. 

 Eurasian hoopoe, Upupa epops

Woodhoopoes and scimitarbills
Order: BucerotiformesFamily: Phoeniculidae

The woodhoopoes are related to the kingfishers, rollers and hoopoes. They most resemble the hoopoes with their long curved bills, used to probe for insects, and short rounded wings. However, they differ in that they have metallic plumage, often blue, green or purple, and lack an erectile crest. 

 Green woodhoopoe, Phoeniculus purpureus
 White-headed woodhoopoe, Phoeniculus bollei
 Forest woodhoopoe, Phoeniculus castaneiceps (A)
 Black scimitarbill, Rhinopomastus aterrimus

Ground-hornbills
Order: BucerotiformesFamily: Bucorvidae

The ground-hornbills are terrestrial birds which feed almost entirely on insects, other birds, snakes, and amphibians.

 Abyssinian ground-hornbill, Bucorvus abyssinicus

Hornbills
Order: BucerotiformesFamily: Bucerotidae

Hornbills are a group of birds whose bill is shaped like a cow's horn, but without a twist, sometimes with a casque on the upper mandible. Frequently, the bill is brightly coloured.

 Red-billed dwarf hornbill, Lophoceros camurus
 African pied hornbill, Lophoceros fasciatus
 African gray hornbill, Lophoceros nasutus
 Northern red-billed hornbill, Tockus erythrorhynchus
 White-crested hornbill, Horizocerus albocristatus
 Black dwarf hornbill, Horizocerus hartlaubi
 Black-casqued hornbill, Ceratogymna atrata
 Black-and-white-casqued hornbill, Bycanistes subcylindricus
 White-thighed hornbill, Bycanistes albotibialis
 Piping hornbill, Bycanistes fistulator

Kingfishers
Order: CoraciiformesFamily: Alcedinidae

Kingfishers are medium-sized birds with large heads, long, pointed bills, short legs and stubby tails. 

 Shining-blue kingfisher, Alcedo quadribrachys
 Malachite kingfisher, Corythornis cristatus
 White-bellied kingfisher, Corythornis leucogaster
 African pygmy kingfisher, Ispidina picta
 African dwarf kingfisher, Ispidina lecontei
 Chocolate-backed kingfisher, Halcyon badia
 Gray-headed kingfisher, Halcyon leucocephala
 Woodland kingfisher, Halcyon senegalensis
 Blue-breasted kingfisher, Halcyon malimbica
 Striped kingfisher, Halcyon chelicuti
 Giant kingfisher, Megaceryle maximus
 Pied kingfisher, Ceryle rudis

Bee-eaters
Order: CoraciiformesFamily: Meropidae

The bee-eaters are a group of near passerine birds in the family Meropidae. Most species are found in Africa but others occur in southern Europe, Madagascar, Australia and New Guinea. They are characterised by richly coloured plumage, slender bodies and usually elongated central tail feathers. All are colourful and have long downturned bills and pointed wings, which give them a swallow-like appearance when seen from afar. 

 Black bee-eater, Merops gularis
 Blue-headed bee-eater, Merops muelleri
 Red-throated bee-eater, Merops bulocki
 Little bee-eater, Merops pusillus
 Blue-breasted bee-eater, Merops variegatus
 Swallow-tailed bee-eater, Merops hirundineus
 Black-headed bee-eater, Merops breweri
 White-throated bee-eater, Merops albicollis
 African green bee-eater, Merops viridissimus
 Blue-cheeked bee-eater, Merops persicus
 European bee-eater, Merops apiaster
 Northern carmine bee-eater, Merops nubicus

Rollers
Order: CoraciiformesFamily: Coraciidae

Rollers resemble crows in size and build, but are more closely related to the kingfishers and bee-eaters. They share the colourful appearance of those groups with blues and browns predominating. The two inner front toes are connected, but the outer toe is not. 

 European roller, Coracias garrulus
 Abyssinian roller, Coracias abyssinica
 Rufous-crowned roller, Coracias naevia
 Blue-bellied roller, Coracias cyanogaster
 Broad-billed roller, Eurystomus glaucurus
 Blue-throated roller, Eurystomus gularis

African barbets
Order: PiciformesFamily: Lybiidae

The African barbets are plump birds, with short necks and large heads. They get their name from the bristles which fringe their heavy bills. Most species are brightly coloured.

 Yellow-billed barbet, Trachyphonus purpuratus
 Gray-throated barbet, Gymnobucco bonapartei
 Sladen's barbet, Gymnobucco sladeni
 Bristle-nosed barbet, Gymnobucco peli
 Speckled tinkerbird, Pogoniulus scolopaceus
 Red-rumped tinkerbird, Pogoniulus atroflavus
 Yellow-throated tinkerbird, Pogoniulus subsulphureus
 Yellow-rumped tinkerbird, Pogoniulus bilineatus
 Yellow-fronted tinkerbird, Pogoniulus chrysoconus
 Yellow-spotted barbet, Buccanodon duchaillui
 Hairy-breasted barbet, Tricholaema hirsuta
 Vieillot's barbet, Lybius vieilloti
 White-headed barbet, Lybius leucocephalus
 Double-toothed barbet, Lybius bidentatus
 Bearded barbet, Lybius dubius
 Black-breasted barbet, Lybius rolleti

Honeyguides
Order: PiciformesFamily: Indicatoridae

Honeyguides are among the few birds that feed on wax. They are named for the greater honeyguide which leads traditional honey-hunters to bees' nests and, after the hunters have harvested the honey, feeds on the remaining contents of the hive. 

 Wahlberg's honeyguide, Prodotiscus regulus
 Zenker's honeyguide, Melignomon zenkeri
 Willcock's honeyguide, Indicator willcocksi
 Least honeyguide, Indicator exilis
 Lesser honeyguide, Indicator minor
 Spotted honeyguide, Indicator maculatus
 Greater honeyguide, Indicator indicator
 Lyre-tailed honeyguide, Melichneutes robustus

Woodpeckers
Order: PiciformesFamily: Picidae

Woodpeckers are small to medium-sized birds with chisel-like beaks, short legs, stiff tails and long tongues used for capturing insects. Some species have feet with two toes pointing forward and two backward, while several species have only three toes. Many woodpeckers have the habit of tapping noisily on tree trunks with their beaks.

 Eurasian wryneck, Jynx torquilla (A)
 Rufous-necked wryneck, Jynx ruficollis
 African piculet, Verreauxia africana
 Gabon woodpecker, Chloropicus gabonensis
 Elliot's woodpecker, Chloropicus elliotii
 Speckle-breasted woodpecker, Chloropicus poecilolaemus
 Cardinal woodpecker, Chloropicus fuscescens
 Bearded woodpecker, Chloropicus namaquus
 Golden-crowned woodpecker, Chloropicus xantholophus
 Brown-backed woodpecker, Chloropicus obsoletus
 African gray woodpecker, Chloropicus goertae
 Brown-eared woodpecker, Campethera caroli
 Buff-spotted woodpecker, Campethera nivosa
 Green-backed woodpecker, Campethera cailliautii
 Fine-spotted woodpecker, Campethera punctuligera
 Golden-tailed woodpecker, Campethera abingoni

Falcons and caracaras
Order: FalconiformesFamily: Falconidae

Falconidae is a family of diurnal birds of prey. They differ from hawks, eagles and kites in that they kill with their beaks instead of their talons. 

 Lesser kestrel, Falco naumanni
 Eurasian kestrel, Falco tinnunculus
 Fox kestrel, Falco alopex
 Gray kestrel, Falco ardosiaceus
 Red-necked falcon, Falco chicquera
 Red-footed falcon, Falco vespertinus (A)
 Eleonora's falcon, Falco eleonorae
 Eurasian hobby, Falco subbuteo (A)
 African hobby, Falco cuvierii
 Lanner falcon, Falco biarmicus
 Peregrine falcon, Falco peregrinus

Old World parrots
Order: PsittaciformesFamily: Psittaculidae

Characteristic features of parrots include a strong curved bill, an upright stance, strong legs, and clawed zygodactyl feet. Many parrots are vividly colored, and some are multi-colored. Old World parrots are found from Africa east across south and southeast Asia and Oceania to Australia and New Zealand.

 Rose-ringed parakeet, Psittacula krameri
 Black-collared lovebird, Agapornis swindernianus
 Red-headed lovebird, Agapornis pullarius

African and New World parrots
Order: PsittaciformesFamily: Psittacidae

Characteristic features of parrots include a strong curved bill, an upright stance, strong legs, and clawed zygodactyl feet. Many parrots are vividly coloured, and some are multi-coloured. Most of the more than 150 species in this family are found in the New World.

 Gray parrot, Psittacus erithacus
 Red-fronted parrot, Poicephalus gulielmi
 Meyer's parrot, Poicephalus meyeri
 Niam-Niam parrot, Poicephalus crassus
 Senegal parrot, Poicephalus senegalus

African and green broadbills
Order: PasseriformesFamily: Calyptomenidae

The broadbills are small, brightly coloured birds, which feed on fruit and also take insects in flycatcher fashion, snapping their broad bills. Their habitat is canopies of wet forests.

 African broadbill, Smithornis capensis
 Gray-headed broadbill, Smithornis sharpei
 Rufous-sided broadbill, Smithornis rufolateralis

Pittas
Order: PasseriformesFamily: Pittidae

Pittas are medium-sized by passerine standards and are stocky, with fairly long, strong legs, short tails and stout bills. Many are brightly coloured. They spend the majority of their time on wet forest floors, eating snails, insects and similar invertebrates. 

 African pitta, Pitta angolensis
 Green-breasted pitta, Pitta reichenowi (A)

Cuckooshrikes
Order: PasseriformesFamily: Campephagidae

The cuckoo-shrikes are small to medium-sized passerine birds. They are predominantly greyish with white and black, although some species are brightly coloured.

 White-breasted cuckooshrike, Coracina pectoralis
 Oriole cuckooshrike, Campephaga oriolina
 Red-shouldered cuckooshrike, Campephaga phoenicea
 Purple-throated cuckooshrike, Campephaga quiscalina
 Blue cuckooshrike, Coracina azurea

Old World orioles
Order: PasseriformesFamily: Oriolidae

The Old World orioles are colourful passerine birds. They are not related to the New World orioles.

 Eurasian golden oriole, Oriolus oriolus
 African golden oriole, Oriolus auratus
 Western black-headed oriole, Oriolus brachyrhynchus
 Black-winged oriole, Oriolus nigripennis

Wattle-eyes and batises
Order: PasseriformesFamily: Platysteiridae

The wattle-eyes, or puffback flycatchers, are small stout passerine birds of the African tropics. They get their name from the brightly coloured fleshy eye decorations found in most species in this group.

 Brown-throated wattle-eye, Platysteira cyanea
 Chestnut wattle-eye, Platysteira castanea
 White-spotted wattle-eye, Platysteira tonsa (A)
 Black-necked wattle-eye, Platysteira chalybea
 Yellow-bellied wattle-eye, Platysteira concreta
 Gray-headed batis, Batis orientalis
Western black-headed batis, Batis erlangeri
 Verreaux's batis, Batis minima
 West African batis, Batis occulta (A)

Vangas, helmetshrikes, and allies
Order: PasseriformesFamily: Vangidae

The helmetshrikes are similar in build to the shrikes, but tend to be colourful species with distinctive crests or other head ornaments, such as wattles, from which they get their name.

 White helmetshrike, Prionops plumatus
 Rufous-bellied helmetshrike, Prionops rufiventris
 African shrike-flycatcher, Megabyas flammulatus
 Black-and-white shrike-flycatcher, Bias musicus

Bushshrikes and allies
Order: PasseriformesFamily: Malaconotidae

Bushshrikes are similar in habits to shrikes, hunting insects and other small prey from a perch on a bush. Although similar in build to the shrikes, these tend to be either colourful species or largely black; some species are quite secretive.

 Brubru, Nilaus afer
 Northern puffback, Dryoscopus gambensis
 Red-eyed puffback, Dryoscopus senegalensis
 Pink-footed puffback, Dryoscopus angolensis
 Sabine's puffback, Dryoscopus sabini
 Marsh tchagra, Tchagra minuta
 Black-crowned tchagra, Tchagra senegala
 Yellow-crowned gonolek, Laniarius barbarus
 Black-headed gonolek, Laniarius erythrogaster
 Lowland sooty boubou, Laniarius leucorhynchus
 Gray-green bushshrike, Telophorus bocagei
 Sulphur-breasted bushshrike, Telophorus sulfureopectus
 Many-colored bushshrike, Telophorus multicolor
 Fiery-breasted bushshrike, Malaconotus cruentus
 Gray-headed bushshrike, Malaconotus blanchoti

Drongos
Order: PasseriformesFamily: Dicruridae

The drongos are mostly black or dark grey in colour, sometimes with metallic tints. They have long forked tails, and some Asian species have elaborate tail decorations. They have short legs and sit very upright when perched, like a shrike. They flycatch or take prey from the ground. 

Sharpe's drongo, Dicrurus sharpei
Shining drongo, Dicrurus atripennis
Glossy-backed drongo, Dicrurus divaricatus
Velvet-mantled drongo, Dicrurus modestus

Monarch flycatchers
Order: PasseriformesFamily: Monarchidae

The monarch flycatchers are small to medium-sized insectivorous passerines which hunt by flycatching.

 Blue-headed crested-flycatcher, Trochocercus nitens
 Black-headed paradise-flycatcher, Terpsiphone rufiventer
 Rufous-vented paradise-flycatcher, Terpsiphone rufocinerea
 Bates's paradise-flycatcher, Terpsiphone batesi
 African paradise-flycatcher, Terpsiphone viridis

Shrikes
Order: PasseriformesFamily: Laniidae

Shrikes are passerine birds known for their habit of catching other birds and small animals and impaling the uneaten portions of their bodies on thorns. A typical shrike's beak is hooked, like a bird of prey.

 Red-backed shrike, Lanius collurio (A)
 Isabelline shrike, Lanius isabellinus (A)
 Emin's shrike, Lanius gubernator
 Great gray shrike, Lanius excubitor (A)
 Lesser gray shrike, Lanius minor (A)
 Gray-backed fiscal, Lanius excubitoroides
 Yellow-billed shrike, Lanius corvinus
 Northern fiscal, Lanius humeralis
 Masked shrike, Lanius nubicus
 Woodchat shrike, Lanius senator

Crows, jays, and magpies
Order: PasseriformesFamily: Corvidae

The family Corvidae includes crows, ravens, jays, choughs, magpies, treepies, nutcrackers and ground jays. Corvids are above average in size among the Passeriformes, and some of the larger species show high levels of intelligence.

 Piapiac, Ptilostomus afer
 Pied crow, Corvus albus

Rockfowl
Order: PasseriformesFamily: Picathartidae

Rockfowl are lanky birds with crow-like bills, long necks, tails and legs, and strong feet adapted to terrestrial feeding. They are similar in size and structure to the completely unrelated roadrunners, but they hop rather than walk. They also have brightly coloured unfeathered heads.

Gray-necked rockfowl, Picathartes oreas (A)

Hyliotas
Order: PasseriformesFamily: Hyliotidae

The members of this small family, all of genus Hyliota, are birds of the forest canopy. They tend to feed in mixed-species flocks.

 Yellow-bellied hyliota, Hyliota flavigaster
 Violet-backed hyliota, Hyliota violacea

Fairy flycatchers
Order: PasseriformesFamily: Stenostiridae

Most of the species of this small family are found in Africa, though a few inhabit tropical Asia. They are not closely related to other birds called "flycatchers".

 African blue flycatcher, Elminia longicauda
 Dusky crested-flycatcher, Elminia nigromitrata

Tits, chickadees, and titmice
Order: PasseriformesFamily: Paridae

The Paridae are mainly small stocky woodland species with short stout bills. Some have crests. They are adaptable birds, with a mixed diet including seeds and insects. 

 White-shouldered black-tit, Melaniparus guineensis
 Dusky tit, Melaniparus funereus

Penduline-tits
Order: PasseriformesFamily: Remizidae

The penduline-tits are a group of small passerine birds related to the true tits. They are insectivores. 

 Yellow penduline-tit, Anthoscopus parvulus
 Forest penduline-tit, Anthoscopus flavifrons

Larks
Order: PasseriformesFamily: Alaudidae

Larks are small terrestrial birds with often extravagant songs and display flights. Most larks are fairly dull in appearance. Their food is insects and seeds. T

 Rufous-rumped lark, Pinarocorys erythropygia
 Chestnut-backed sparrow-lark, Eremopterix leucotis
 Rufous-naped lark, Mirafra africana
 Flappet lark, Mirafra rufocinnamomea
 Horsfield’s bushlark, Mirafra javanica (A)
 Sun lark, Galerida modesta
 Crested lark, Galerida cristata

Nicators
Order: PasseriformesFamily: Nicatoridae

The nicators are shrike-like, with hooked bills. They are endemic to sub-Saharan Africa.

Western nicator, Nicator chloris 
 Yellow-throated nicator, Nicator vireo

African warblers
Order: PasseriformesFamily: Macrosphenidae

African warblers are small to medium-sized insectivores which are found in a wide variety of habitats south of the Sahara.

 Green crombec, Sylvietta virens
 Lemon-bellied crombec, Sylvietta denti (A)
 Northern crombec, Sylvietta brachyura
 Moustached grass-warbler, Melocichla mentalis
 Yellow longbill, Macrosphenus flavicans
 Gray longbill, Macrosphenus concolor
 Green hylia, Hylia prasina
 Tit-hylia, Pholidornis rushiae

Cisticolas and allies
Order: PasseriformesFamily: Cisticolidae

The Cisticolidae are warblers found mainly in warmer southern regions of the Old World. They are generally very small birds of drab brown or grey appearance found in open country such as grassland or scrub. 

 Senegal eremomela, Eremomela pusilla
 Green-backed eremomela, Eremomela canescens
 Rufous-crowned eremomela, Eremomela badiceps (A)
 Red-winged gray warbler, Drymocichla incana
 White-chinned prinia, Schistolais leucopogon
 Black-collared apalis, Oreolais pulchra
 Green-backed camaroptera, Camaroptera brachyura
 Yellow-browed camaroptera, Camaroptera superciliaris
 Olive-green camaroptera, Camaroptera chloronota
 Buff-bellied warbler, Phyllolais pulchella
 Black-capped apalis, Apalis nigriceps (A)
 Black-throated apalis, Apalis jacksoni (A)
 Yellow-breasted apalis, Apalis flavida
 Buff-throated apalis, Apalis rufogularis
 Gosling's apalis, Apalis goslingi
 Tawny-flanked prinia, Prinia subflava
 Banded prinia, Prinia bairdii
 Red-winged prinia, Prinia erythroptera
 Black-faced rufous-warbler, Bathmocercus rufus
 Oriole warbler, Hypergerus atriceps
 Red-faced cisticola, Cisticola erythrops
 Singing cisticola, Cisticola cantans
 Whistling cisticola, Cisticola lateralis
 Chattering cisticola, Cisticola anonymus
 Rock-loving cisticola, Cisticola aberrans
 Red-pate cisticola, Cisticola ruficeps
 Winding cisticola, Cisticola marginatus
 Croaking cisticola, Cisticola natalensis
 Siffling cisticola, Cisticola brachypterus
 Rufous cisticola, Cisticola rufus
 Foxy cisticola, Cisticola troglodytes
 Zitting cisticola, Cisticola juncidis
 Black-backed cisticola, Cisticola eximius (A)

Reed warblers and allies
Order: PasseriformesFamily: Acrocephalidae

The members of this family are usually rather large for "warblers". Most are rather plain olivaceous brown above with much yellow to beige below. They are usually found in open woodland, reedbeds, or tall grass. The family occurs mostly in southern to western Eurasia and surroundings, but it also ranges far into the Pacific, with some species in Africa.

 African yellow-warbler, Iduna natalensis
 Melodious warbler, Hippolais polyglotta
 Icterine warbler, Hippolais icterina (A)
 Sedge warbler, Acrocephalus schoenobaenus
 Eurasian reed warbler, Acrocephalus scirpaceus
 Lesser swamp warbler, Acrocephalus gracilirostris (A)
 Greater swamp warbler, Acrocephalus rufescens
 Great reed warbler, Acrocephalus arundinaceus

Grassbirds and allies
Order: PasseriformesFamily: Locustellidae

Locustellidae are a family of small insectivorous songbirds found mainly in Eurasia, Africa, and the Australian region. They are smallish birds with tails that are usually long and pointed, and tend to be drab brownish or buffy all over.

Dja River swamp warbler, Bradypterus grandis

Swallows
Order: PasseriformesFamily: Hirundinidae

The family Hirundinidae is adapted to aerial feeding. They have a slender streamlined body, long pointed wings and a short bill with a wide gape. The feet are adapted to perching rather than walking, and the front toes are partially joined at the base.

 African river martin, Pseudochelidon eurystomina (A)
 Plain martin, Riparia paludicola
 Congo martin, Riparia congica (A)
 Bank swallow, Riparia riparia
 Banded martin, Neophedina cincta
 Rock martin, Ptyonoprogne fuligula
 Barn swallow, Hirundo rustica
 Red-chested swallow, Hirundo lucida (A)
 Ethiopian swallow, Hirundo aethiopica
 White-throated blue swallow, Hirundo nigrita
 Wire-tailed swallow, Hirundo smithii
 Red-rumped swallow, Cecropis daurica
 Lesser striped swallow, Cecropis abyssinica
 Rufous-chested swallow, Cecropis semirufa
 Mosque swallow, Cecropis senegalensis
 Preuss's swallow, Petrochelidon preussi
 Common house-martin, Delichon urbicum
 Square-tailed sawwing, Psalidoprocne nitens
 Black sawwing, Psalidoprocne pristoptera
 Gray-rumped swallow, Pseudhirundo griseopyga

Bulbuls
Order: PasseriformesFamily: Pycnonotidae

Bulbuls are medium-sized songbirds. Some are colourful with yellow, red or orange vents, cheeks, throats or supercilia, but most are drab, with uniform olive-brown to black plumage. Some species have distinct crests.

 Slender-billed greenbul, Stelgidillas gracilirostris
 Golden greenbul, Calyptocichla serinus (A)
 Red-tailed bristlebill, Bleda syndactylus
 Lesser bristlebill, Bleda notatus
 Simple greenbul, Chlorocichla simplex
 Yellow-necked greenbul, Chlorocichla falkensteini
 Honeyguide greenbul, Baeopogon indicator
 Sjostedt's greenbul, Baeopogon clamans
 Yellow-throated greenbul, Atimastillas flavicollis
 Spotted greenbul, Ixonotus guttatus
 Swamp greenbul, Thescelocichla leucopleura
 Red-tailed greenbul, Criniger calurus
 Eastern bearded-greenbul, Criniger chloronotus
 White-bearded greenbul, Criniger ndussumensis
 Gray greenbul, Eurillas gracilis
 Ansorge's greenbul, Eurillas ansorgei (A)
 Plain greenbul, Eurillas curvirostris
 Yellow-whiskered bulbul, Eurillas latirostris
 Little greenbul, Eurillas virens
 Leaf-love, Phyllastrephus scandens
 Icterine greenbul, Phyllastrephus icterinus
 Xavier's greenbul, Phyllastrephus xavieri
 White-throated greenbul, Phyllastrephus albigularis
 Common bulbul, Pycnonotus barbatus

Leaf warblers
Order: PasseriformesFamily: Phylloscopidae

Leaf warblers are a family of small insectivorous birds found mostly in Eurasia and ranging into Wallacea and Africa. The species are of various sizes, often green-plumaged above and yellow below, or more subdued with grayish-green to grayish-brown colors.

 Wood warbler, Phylloscopus sibilatrix
 Willow warbler, Phylloscopus trochilus

Bush warblers and allies
Order: PasseriformesFamily: Scotocercidae

The members of this family are found throughout Africa, Asia, and Polynesia. Their taxonomy is in flux, and some authorities place genus Erythrocerus in another family.

 Chestnut-capped flycatcher, Erythrocercus mccallii

Sylviid warblers, parrotbills, and allies
Order: PasseriformesFamily: Sylviidae

The family Sylviidae is a group of small insectivorous passerine birds. They mainly occur as breeding species, as the common name implies, in Europe, Asia and, to a lesser extent, Africa. Most are of generally undistinguished appearance, but many have distinctive songs.

 Eurasian blackcap, Sylvia atricapilla (A)
 Garden warbler, Sylvia borin
 Barred warbler, Curruca nisoria (A)
 Greater whitethroat, Curruca communis (A)

White-eyes, yuhinas, and Allies
Order: PasseriformesFamily: Zosteropidae

The white-eyes are small and mostly undistinguished, their plumage above being generally some dull colour like greenish-olive, but some species have a white or bright yellow throat, breast or lower parts, and several have buff flanks. As their name suggests, many species have a white ring around each eye. 

 Forest white-eye, Zosterops stenocricotus
 Northern yellow white-eye, Zosterops senegalensis

Ground babblers and allies
Order: PasseriformesFamily: Pellorneidae

These small to medium-sized songbirds have soft fluffy plumage but are otherwise rather diverse. Members of the genus Illadopsis are found in forests, but some other genera are birds of scrublands.

 Brown illadopsis, Illadopsis fulvescens
 Pale-breasted illadopsis, Illadopsis rufipennis
 Blackcap illadopsis, Illadopsis cleaveri
 Scaly-breasted illadopsis, Illadopsis albipectus
 Thrush babbler, Illadopsis turdina

Laughingthrushes and allies
Order: PasseriformesFamily: Leiothrichidae

The members of this family are diverse in size and colouration, though those of genus Turdoides tend to be brown or greyish. The family is found in Africa, India, and southeast Asia.

 Capuchin babbler, Turdoides atripennis
 Brown babbler, Turdoides plebejus
 Blackcap babbler, Turdoides reinwardtii

Treecreepers
Order: PasseriformesFamily: Certhiidae

Treecreepers are small woodland birds, brown above and white below. They have thin pointed down-curved bills, which they use to extricate insects from bark. They have stiff tail feathers, like woodpeckers, which they use to support themselves on vertical trees.

 African spotted creeper, Salpornis salvadori

Oxpeckers
Order: PasseriformesFamily: Buphagidae

As both the English and scientific names of these birds imply, they feed on ectoparasites, primarily ticks, found on large mammals.

Yellow-billed oxpecker, Buphagus africanus

Starlings
Order: PasseriformesFamily: Sturnidae

Starlings are small to medium-sized passerine birds. Their flight is strong and direct and they are very gregarious. Their preferred habitat is fairly open country. They eat insects and fruit. Plumage is typically dark with a metallic sheen.

 Violet-backed starling, Cinnyricinclus leucogaster
 Neumann's starling, Onychognathus neumanni
 Chestnut-winged starling, Onychognathus fulgidus
 White-collared starling, Grafisia torquata
 Narrow-tailed starling, Poeoptera lugubris
 Purple-headed starling, Hylopsar purpureiceps
 Long-tailed glossy starling, Lamprotornis caudatus
 Splendid starling, Lamprotornis splendidus
 Lesser blue-eared starling, Lamprotornis chloropterus
 Purple starling, Lamprotornis purpureus
 Bronze-tailed starling, Lamprotornis chalcurus

Thrushes and allies
Order: PasseriformesFamily: Turdidae

The thrushes are a group of passerine birds that occur mainly in the Old World. They are plump, soft plumaged, small to medium-sized insectivores or sometimes omnivores, often feeding on the ground. Many have attractive songs.

 Rufous flycatcher-thrush, Neocossyphus fraseri
 Red-tailed ant-thrush, Neocossyphus rufus (A)
 White-tailed ant-thrush, Neocossyphus poensis
 African thrush, Turdus pelios

Old World flycatchers
Order: PasseriformesFamily: Muscicapidae

Old World flycatchers are a large group of small passerine birds native to the Old World. They are mainly small arboreal insectivores. The appearance of these birds is highly varied, but they mostly have weak songs and harsh calls.

 African dusky flycatcher, Muscicapa adusta
 Little flycatcher, Muscicapa epulata (A)
 Yellow-footed flycatcher, Muscicapa sethsmithi
 Spotted flycatcher, Muscicapa striata
 Gambaga flycatcher, Muscicapa gambagae
 Swamp flycatcher, Muscicapa aquatica
 Cassin's flycatcher, Muscicapa cassini
 Sooty flycatcher, Bradornis fuliginosus
 Dusky-blue flycatcher, Bradornis comitatus
 Pale flycatcher, Agricola pallidus
 White-browed forest-flycatcher, Fraseria cinerascens
 African forest-flycatcher, Fraseria ocreata
 Gray-throated tit-flycatcher, 	Fraseria griseigularis
 Gray tit-flycatcher, Fraseria plumbea
 Olivaceous flycatcher, Fraseria olivascens
 Ashy flycatcher, Fraseria caerulescens
 Northern black-flycatcher, Melaenornis edolioides
 Fire-crested alethe, Alethe castanea
 Forest scrub-robin, Cercotrichas leucosticta
 Brown-backed scrub-robin, Cercotrichas hartlaubi (A)
 Blue-shouldered robin-chat, Cossypha cyanocampter
 Gray-winged robin-chat, Cossypha polioptera
 White-browed robin-chat, Cossypha heuglini
 Red-capped robin-chat, Cossypha natalensis
 Snowy-crowned robin-chat, Cossypha niveicapilla
 White-crowned robin-chat, Cossypha albicapilla
 Rufous-tailed palm-thrush, Cichladusa ruficauda
 Brown-chested alethe, Chamaetylas poliocephala
 Yellow-breasted forest robin, Stiphrornis mabirae
 Lowland akalat, Sheppardia cyornithopsis
 Common nightingale, Luscinia megarhynchos
 European pied flycatcher, Ficedula hypoleuca
 Collared flycatcher, Ficedula albicollis (A)
 Common redstart, Phoenicurus phoenicurus
 Rufous-tailed rock-thrush, Monticola saxatilis
 Blue rock-thrush, Monticola solitarius (A)
 Whinchat, Saxicola rubetra
 Mocking cliff-chat, Thamnolaea cinnamomeiventris
 Sooty chat, Myrmecocichla nigra
 Northern anteater-chat, Myrmecocichla aethiops
 Northern wheatear, Oenanthe oenanthe
 Isabelline wheatear, Oenanthe isabellina (A)
 Heuglin's wheatear, Oenanthe heuglini
 Western black-eared wheatear, Oenanthe hispanica (A)
 White-fronted black-chat, Oenanthe albifrons
 Familiar chat, Oenanthe familiaris

Sunbirds and spiderhunters
Order: PasseriformesFamily: Nectariniidae

The sunbirds and spiderhunters are very small passerine birds which feed largely on nectar, although they will also take insects, especially when feeding young. Flight is fast and direct on their short wings. Most species can take nectar by hovering like a hummingbird, but usually perch to feed.

 Fraser's sunbird, Deleornis fraseri (A)
 Western violet-backed sunbird, Anthreptes longuemarei
 Violet-tailed sunbird, Anthreptes aurantius
 Little green sunbird, Anthreptes seimundi
 Green sunbird, Anthreptes rectirostris
 Collared sunbird, Hedydipna collaris
 Pygmy sunbird, Hedydipna platura
 Reichenbach's sunbird, Anabathmis reichenbachii (A)
 Green-headed sunbird, Cyanomitra verticalis
 Blue-throated brown sunbird, Cyanomitra cyanolaema
 Olive sunbird, Cyanomitra olivacea
 Green-throated sunbird, Chalcomitra rubescens
 Scarlet-chested sunbird, Chalcomitra senegalensis
 Olive-bellied sunbird, Cinnyris chloropygius
 Tiny sunbird, Cinnyris minullus (A)
 Northern double-collared sunbird, Cinnyris preussi
 Beautiful sunbird, Cinnyris pulchellus
 Purple-banded sunbird, Cinnyris bifasciatus
 Orange-tufted sunbird, Cinnyris bouvieri
 Palestine sunbird, Cinnyris oseus
 Splendid sunbird, Cinnyris coccinigaster
 Johanna's sunbird, Cinnyris johannae
 Superb sunbird, Cinnyris superbus
 Variable sunbird, Cinnyris venustus
 Bates's sunbird, Cinnyris batesi (A)
 Copper sunbird, Cinnyris cupreus

Weavers and allies
Order: PasseriformesFamily: Ploceidae

The weavers are small passerine birds related to the finches. They are seed-eating birds with rounded conical bills. The males of many species are brightly coloured, usually in red or yellow and black, some species show variation in colour only in the breeding season.

 Speckle-fronted weaver, Sporopipes frontalis
 Chestnut-crowned sparrow-weaver, Plocepasser superciliosus
 Red-crowned malimbe, Malimbus coronatus (A)
 Black-throated malimbe, Malimbus cassini
 Red-bellied malimbe, Malimbus erythrogaster
 Blue-billed malimbe, Malimbus nitens
 Crested malimbe, Malimbus malimbicus
 Red-headed malimbe, Malimbus rubricollis
 Red-headed weaver, Anaplectes rubriceps
 Baglafecht weaver, Ploceus baglafecht
 Little weaver, Ploceus luteolus
 Black-necked weaver, Ploceus nigricollis
 Spectacled weaver, Ploceus ocularis
 Orange weaver, Ploceus aurantius
 Vitelline masked-weaver, Ploceus vitellinus
 Heuglin's masked-weaver, Ploceus heuglini
 Vieillot's black weaver, Ploceus nigerrimus
 Village weaver, Ploceus cucullatus
 Black-headed weaver, Ploceus melanocephalus
 Yellow-mantled weaver, Ploceus tricolor
 Maxwell's black weaver, Ploceus albinucha (A)
 Yellow-capped weaver, Ploceus dorsomaculatus
 Preuss's weaver, Ploceus preussi (A)
 Compact weaver, Pachyphantes superciliosus
 Red-headed quelea, Quelea erythrops
 Red-billed quelea, Quelea quelea
 Bob-tailed weaver, 	Brachycope anomala (A)
 Northern red bishop, Euplectes franciscanus
 Black-winged bishop, Euplectes hordeaceus
 Black bishop, Euplectes gierowii
 Yellow-crowned bishop, Euplectes afer
 White-winged widowbird, Euplectes albonotatus
 Yellow-mantled widowbird, Euplectes macroura
 Red-collared widowbird, Euplectes ardens
 Fan-tailed widowbird, Euplectes axillaris
 Grosbeak weaver, Amblyospiza albifrons

Waxbills and allies
Order: PasseriformesFamily: Estrildidae

The estrildid finches are small passerine birds of the Old World tropics and Australasia. They are gregarious and often colonial seed eaters with short thick but pointed bills. They are all similar in structure and habits, but have wide variation in plumage colours and patterns. 

 Bronze mannikin, Spermestes cucullatus
 Magpie mannikin, Spermestes fringilloides
 Black-and-white mannikin, Spermestes bicolor
 African silverbill, Euodice cantans
 Green-backed twinspot, Mandingoa nitidula
 Woodhouse's antpecker, Parmoptila woodhousei
 White-breasted nigrita, Nigrita fusconota
 Chestnut-breasted nigrita, Nigrita bicolor
 Gray-headed nigrita, Nigrita canicapilla
 Pale-fronted nigrita, Nigrita luteifrons
 Gray-headed oliveback, Delacourella capistrata
 Lavender waxbill, Glaucestrilda caerulescens
 Black-crowned waxbill, Estrilda nonnula
 Black-headed waxbill, Estrilda atricapilla (A)
 Orange-cheeked waxbill, Estrilda melpoda
 Fawn-breasted waxbill, Estrilda paludicola
 Common waxbill, Estrilda astrild
 Black-rumped waxbill, Estrilda troglodytes
 Quailfinch, Ortygospiza atricollis
 Zebra waxbill, Amandava subflava
 Red-cheeked cordonbleu, Uraeginthus bengalus
 Grant's bluebill, Spermophaga poliogenys
 Western bluebill, Spermophaga haematina
 Red-headed bluebill, Spermophaga ruficapilla
 Black-bellied seedcracker, Pyrenestes ostrinus
 Green-winged pytilia, Pytilia melba
 Red-winged pytilia, Pytilia phoenicoptera
 Red-faced pytilia, Pytilia hypogrammica
 Dybowski's twinspot, Euschistospiza dybowskii
 Brown twinspot, Clytospiza monteiri
 Red-billed firefinch, Lagonosticta senegala
 African firefinch, Lagonosticta rubricata
 Black-bellied firefinch, Lagonosticta rara
 Bar-breasted firefinch, Lagonosticta rufopicta
 Black-faced firefinch, Lagonosticta larvata

Indigobirds
Order: PasseriformesFamily: Viduidae

The indigobirds are finch-like species which usually have black or indigo predominating in their plumage. All are brood parasites, which lay their eggs in the nests of estrildid finches. 

 Pin-tailed whydah, Vidua macroura
 Sahel paradise-whydah, Vidua orientalis
 Exclamatory paradise-whydah, Vidua interjecta
 Village indigobird, Vidua chalybeata
 Wilson's indigobird, Vidua wilsoni
 Cameroon indigobird, Vidua camerunensis
 Parasitic weaver, Anomalospiza imberbis

Old World sparrows
Order: PasseriformesFamily: Passeridae

Old World sparrows are small passerine birds. In general, sparrows tend to be small, plump, brown or grey birds with short tails and short powerful beaks. Sparrows are seed eaters, but they also consume small insects.

 House sparrow, Passer domesticus
 Northern gray-headed sparrow, Passer griseus
 Yellow-spotted bush sparrow, Gymnoris pyrgita (A)
 Sahel bush sparrow, Gymnoris dentata

Wagtails and pipits
Order: PasseriformesFamily: Motacillidae

Motacillidae is a family of small passerine birds with medium to long tails. They include the wagtails, longclaws and pipits. They are slender, ground feeding insectivores of open country.

 Mountain wagtail, Motacilla clara
 Gray wagtail, Motacilla cinerea
 Western yellow wagtail, Motacilla flava
 African pied wagtail, Motacilla aguimp
 White wagtail, Motacilla alba
 Tawny pipit, Anthus campestris (A)
 Plain-backed pipit, Anthus leucophrys
 Tree pipit, Anthus trivialis
 Red-throated pipit, Anthus cervinus
 Yellow-throated longclaw, Macronyx croceus

Finches, euphonias, and allies
Order: PasseriformesFamily: Fringillidae

Finches are seed-eating passerine birds, that are small to moderately large and have a strong beak, usually conical and in some species very large. All have twelve tail feathers and nine primaries. These birds have a bouncing flight with alternating bouts of flapping and gliding on closed wings, and most sing well.

 White-rumped seedeater, Crithagra leucopygius
 Yellow-fronted canary, Crithagra mozambicus
 West African seedeater, Crithagra canicapilla

Old World buntings
Order: PasseriformesFamily: Emberizidae

The emberizids are a large family of passerine birds. They are seed-eating birds with distinctively shaped bills. Many emberizid species have distinctive head patterns.

 Brown-rumped bunting, Emberiza affinis
 Rock bunting, Emberiza cia (A)
 Cabanis's bunting, Emberiza cabanisi
 Golden-breasted bunting, Emberiza flaviventris
 Gosling's bunting, Emberiza goslingi

See also
 List of birds
 Lists of birds by region

References

External links
Birds of the Central African Republic - World Institute for Conservation and Environment

Central African Republic
Central African Republic
Birds
Central African Republic